Monaco is a monospaced sans-serif typeface designed by Susan Kare and Kris Holmes. It ships with macOS and was already present with all previous versions of the Mac operating system. A unique feature of the font is the high curvature of its parentheses as well as the width of its square brackets, the result of these being that an empty pair of parentheses or square brackets will strongly resemble a circle or square, respectively.

Monaco has been released in at least three forms. The original was a bitmap monospace font that still appears in the ROMs of even New World Macs, and is still available in recent macOS releases (size 9, with disabled antialiasing). The second is the outline form, loosely similar to Lucida Mono and created as a TrueType font for System 6 and 7; this is the standard font used for all other sizes. There was briefly a third known as MPW, since it was designed to be used with the Macintosh Programmer's Workshop IDE; it was essentially a straight conversion of the bitmap font into an outline font with the addition of some of the same disambiguation features as were added to the TrueType Monaco.

The original Monaco 9 point bitmap font was designed so that when a Compact Macintosh window was displayed full screen, such as for a terminal emulator program, it would result in a standard text user interface display of 80 columns by 25 lines.

With the August 2009 release of Mac OS X 10.6 Snow Leopard, Menlo was introduced as the default monospaced font instead of Monaco in Terminal and Xcode, However, Monaco remains a part of macOS. Monaco is the default font in the current Python IDLE when used on a Mac running OS X El Capitan.

Furthermore, in September 2015, Mac OS X 10.11 El Capitan introduced SF Mono, a monospaced variant of the San Francisco font family, as the default monospaced font instead of Menlo. Nevertheless, SF Mono is only available in Terminal or Xcode application.

See also
 Apple typography
 ProFont

References

External links

 
 

Monospaced typefaces
Sans-serif typefaces
Apple Inc. typefaces
Macintosh operating systems
MacOS
Typefaces and fonts introduced in 1983
Typefaces designed by Susan Kare
Typefaces designed by Kris Holmes